Schönau an der Brend is a municipality with 1,378 inhabitants in the district of Rhön-Grabfeld in northern Bavaria, Germany.  It consists of two villages: Schönau an der Brend and Burgwallbach.

Points of interest
 Gyrowheel Monument

References

Rhön-Grabfeld